Jackie Simes (born November 20, 1942) is an American track cyclist. He competed in the sprint event at the 1960, 1964 and 1968 Summer Olympics, and in the 1968 time trial. He was also the 1964 National Champion.

References

External links
 

1942 births
Living people
American male cyclists
Olympic cyclists of the United States
Cyclists at the 1960 Summer Olympics
Cyclists at the 1964 Summer Olympics
Cyclists at the 1968 Summer Olympics
People from Harrington Park, New Jersey
Sportspeople from Bergen County, New Jersey
Pan American Games medalists in cycling
Pan American Games silver medalists for the United States
Cyclists at the 1967 Pan American Games